Ethan Vogt (born July 13, 1974, in Boston Massachusetts) is an American filmmaker, photographer, visual artist and festival producer.

Profile
He is the son of Eric E. and Susan (née Smith) Vogt and the grandson of Evon Z. Vogt.

Ethan studied photography and filmmaking as an undergraduate at Harvard University where he met the writer/director Andrew Bujalski in an introductory film class.  Ethan would later producing Bujalski's feature films, Funny Ha Ha (2003), Mutual Appreciation (2005) and Beeswax (2009) which were distributed internationally to critical acclaim. Funny Ha Ha is considered the first "mumblecore" film and was recognized as one of the 10 most culturally, commercially or technologically important, consequential or groundbreaking films of 2000–9" by A.O. Scott, a chief film critic in the New York Times.

In 2005 when studying at NYU, Ethan wrote and directed "Game: On" a branded-content short for Volvo North America cited as one of the first commercial projects to combine live-action filmmaking with machinima. It was awarded Best Picture and Best Commercial Machinima in the 2005 Machinima Film Festival and recognized for "Distinctive Merit" in the 84th Annual Art Director Club Awards. The short's production process was featured in an article by Clive Thompson in the New York Times Magazine "The Xbox Auteurs", and the book Machinima: Making Animated Movies in 3D Virtual Environments (Muska & Lipman Publishing, 2005).  Ethan's  real-time video sets with live music "Live Projections Volume One" premiered at the Marfa Film Festival in 2010.

On October 2, 2010, Ethan produced Bring to Light a free public nighttime festival of light, sound and projection art in Greenpoint, Brooklyn which was the first Nuit Blanche event in New York City.

References

External links

Huff Post

American photographers
American cinematographers
American filmmakers
Living people
1974 births
New York University alumni
Harvard University alumni